4U 0142+61 is a magnetar at an approximate distance of  from Earth, located in the constellation Cassiopeia.

In an article published in Nature on April 6, 2006, Deepto Chakrabarty et al. of MIT revealed that a circumstellar disk was discovered around the pulsar. This may prove that pulsar planets are common around neutron stars. The debris disk is likely to be composed of mainly heavier metals. The star had undergone a supernova event approximately 100,000 years ago. The disk orbits about 1.6 million kilometers away from the pulsar and probably contains about 10 Earth-masses of material. This also marks the first time that a pulsar has been discovered with a debris disk orbiting it.

In May 2022, the first study by the IXPE space observatory hinted at the possibility of vacuum birefringence on 4U 0142+61.

In November 2022, astronomers using the IXPE reported that the star may have a solid surface, with no atmosphere.

References

External links
  First signs of weird quantum property of empty space? (November 30, 2016) Phys.org
  Scientists crack mystery of planet formation (April 5, 2006) CNN
 Spitzer Sees New Planet Disk Around Dead Star (April 7, 2006) SpaceDaily
 Birth of 'Phoenix' Planets?
 4U0142+61
 1RXS J014621.5+614509

Magnetars
Circumstellar disks
Cassiopeia (constellation)
Pulsar planets